Millicent Genevieve "Millie" Knight (born 15 January 1999) is a British skier and student who competes at international level for ParalympicsGB in alpine skiing in the slalom, giant slalom Super-G, Super Combined and Downhill events with a sighted guide, Brett Wild. When Knight was one year old, she contracted an illness, diagnosed at age three, which resulted in the loss of most of her vision by the age of six. She joined the Great Britain Paralympic skiing team in 2012, and progressed to compete at international-level events. Knight was the British flagbearer at Sochi in 2014 – her debut Paralympics - where, at the age of 15, she was the youngest person ever to compete for ParalympicsGB at the Winter Games. In the same year Knight also became an Honorary Doctor of the University of Kent.

Early life and education
Knight was born on 15 January 1999 in Canterbury, Kent. She was six when she lost much of her vision; in her left eye she has 5–10% peripheral vision, and in her right eye she has 5%.

 Knight was studying for her GCSEs in tandem with her sporting career. She was enrolled at King's School in Canterbury; her first year studying there was 2012.

In 2016, Knight obtained 3 As at A-Level, securing her a place at The University of Kent to study psychology starting in 2019.

Skiing career
In 2006 at the age of seven, shortly before Knight lost the majority of her sight, she had been to France on a skiing holiday and was encouraged to try the sport by her mother. Knight was inspired to take up the sport competitively when she met sit-skier Sean Rose, shortly after he had competed at the 2010 Winter Paralympics. Her mother was Knight's first sighted guide until late January 2013 for financial reasons. The pair competed together in visually impaired (VI) races.

In November 2012, at age 13, Knight began training with Great Britain's Paralympic development squad. She raced at the Europa Cup in slalom and giant slalom. in spring 2013. Her stand in, temporary sighted guide at the Games, Rachael Ferrier, briefly joined Knight at the end of 2013.

Knight competes in class B2 due to her lack of complete vision, a classification between being blind and visually impaired.

2014 Paralympics
Knight's debut Paralympics was the 2014 Winter Paralympics in Sochi; competing at the age of 15 made her the youngest ParalympicsGB competitor at any Winter Paralympics. She was the flag bearer at the opening ceremony for ParalympicsGB, carrying the flag at the Fisht Olympic Stadium, an honour Knight described as "a surprise". She competed for ParalympicsGB in the slalom on 14 March, completing both of her runs, and finishing fifth, and competed in the giant slalom on 16 March, again finishing fifth. There was not any significant expectation on Knight at the 2014 Paralympics, as her target is the 2018 Winter Paralympics in Pyeongchang.

Post-Sochi
Following the Sochi games, it was announced in April 2014 that Knight would participate in the Queen's Baton Relay on 5 June 2014, carrying the Baton in Kent.

Knight immediately parted company with Ferrier after the 2014 Paralympics: as a result Knight competed in the 2014–15 season with a series of stand-in guides. That season she travelled to Canada to compete at the 2015 IPC Alpine Skiing World Championships in Panorama Mountain Village in British Columbia.

Prior to the Championships Knight had won two gold medals on the World Cup tour and hopes were high that she may medal. At Panorama Knight took part in the two technical events, the slalom and giant slalom, as she was still too young to compete in the speed events. In her first event, the giant slalom, Knight took the lead in the first run with a time of 1:12.90, but despite bettering this time in her second run with 1:11.49, she was beaten into silver medal place by a third of a second by Russia's Aleksandra Frantseva. Two days later Knight took part in the slalom, winning bronze, Britain's only two medals of the games.

The following season Knight teamed up with guide Brett Wild, who had previously raced with Knight's coach Euan Bennet on the Scottish ski team. After initially meeting at a training camp in December 2015, the pair competed together at the World Cup finals in Aspen, Colorado, where they took two wins in the downhill and super-G and a third place in the giant slalom: this success convinced the pair to focus on the speed disciplines, which they felt were their strength.

In the run-up to the 2017 World Para Alpine Skiing Championships in Tarvisio, Italy, Knight enjoyed a great deal of success on the World Cup circuit, taking 11 medals including seven golds in the months leading up to the championships. At the Championships themselves, Knight and guide Brett Wild took gold in the downhill with a time of 1:13.42, beating five-time Paralympic champion Henrieta Farkašová by 1.2 seconds. Team GB officials stated that this was the first world championship title for a British paraskier. Knight and Wild subsequently took a silver behind Farkašová in the Super Combined and a second silver in the Giant Slalom.

Since the World Championships in February, Knight sustained concussion though a crash at the World Cup Finals in March in South Korea. The crash took her out of action for six months. However she was still crowned World Cup downhill champion for the season.

In July 2017, Knight became an Honorary Doctor of The University of Kent.

2018 Paralympics
At the 2018 Paralympics in Pyongchang, South Korea, Knight took two silver medals on the opening weekend of the Games in the downhill and super-G, before taking the bronze in the slalom on the final day of the Paralympics.

2021 World Para Snow Sports Championships

In 2022, she won the gold medal in the women's visually impaired super combined event at the 2021 World Para Snow Sports Championships held in Lillehammer, Norway. She also won the bronze medal in the women's visually impaired Super-G event.

References

External links 
 
 

1999 births
British female alpine skiers
Living people
Alpine skiers at the 2014 Winter Paralympics
Alpine skiers at the 2018 Winter Paralympics
Alpine skiers at the 2022 Winter Paralympics
Medalists at the 2018 Winter Paralympics
Medalists at the 2022 Winter Paralympics
Paralympic alpine skiers of Great Britain
Paralympic athletes with a vision impairment
Paralympic bronze medalists for Great Britain
Paralympic silver medalists for Great Britain
People educated at The King's School, Canterbury
Sportspeople from Canterbury
Alumni of the University of Kent
Paralympic medalists in alpine skiing
British blind people